TT Corvi (TT Crv) is a semiregular variable star in the constellation Corvus. It is a red giant of spectral type M3III and average apparent magnitude 6.48 around 923 light years distant. It shines with a luminosity approximately 993 times that of the Sun and has a surface temperature of 3630 K.

References

Corvus (constellation)
M-type giants

Semiregular variable stars
Corvi, TT